Groupe Serdy is a Canadian television broadcasting and video production company based in Longueuil, Quebec.

Assets

Television broadcasting
 Évasion: a specialty channel devoted to travel and adventure.
 Zeste: a specialty channel devoted to food.

Production
 idHD Studio: video production
 Serdy Video: video production

Publishing
 Zeste: a food magazine modeled after the television channel of the same name.

External links
 Groupe Serdy

Companies based in Longueuil
Television broadcasting companies of Canada
Television production companies of Canada